This Is Love may refer to:

Albums
 This Is Love (Johnny Mathis album) or the title song, 1964
 This Is Love (Lee Ritenour album), 1998
 This Is Love (EP), by Sanctus Real, or the title song, 2016
 This Is Love, by the Archies, or the title song, 1971

Songs

 "This Is Love" (Gary Numan song), 1986
 "This Is Love" (George Harrison song), 1988
 "This Is Love" (Hikaru Utada song), 2006
 "This Is Love" (PJ Harvey song), 2001
 "This Is Love" (will.i.am song), 2012
 "This Is Love", by Demy, representing Greece in the Eurovision Song Contest 2017
 "This Is Love", by Dido from Still on My Mind, 2019
 "This Is Love", by Kelly Rowland from Ms. Kelly, 2007
 "This Is Love", by Kelly Rowland from Talk a Good Game, 2013
 "This Is Love", by Kim Hyun-joong, 2019
 "This Is Love", by Mary Chapin Carpenter from Stones in the Road, 1994
 "This Is Love", by Paul Anka, 1978
 "This Is Love", by Tony Banks from The Fugitive, 1983

Other uses
 This Is Love (film), a 2009 German film
 This Is Love (podcast), a podcast that investigates stories of love

See also 
 So This Is Love (disambiguation)
 Is This Love? (disambiguation)